Euphorbia schillingii, or Schilling spurge, is a species of flowering plant in the spurge family Euphorbiaceae, native to Nepal. The flowers are useful in flower arranging.

The Latin specific epithet schillingii honours its finder, the plant hunter Tony Schilling (born 1935).

In cultivation it grows best in rich, moist soil in a partially-shaded location. It has gained the Royal Horticultural Society’s Award of Garden Merit.

All euphorbias are toxic if ingested, and produce an irritant milky sap when cut or broken.

References

Flora of Nepal
schillingii